Haller is a village in the commune of Waldbillig, in eastern Luxembourg.  , the village has a population of 216.

See also
 List of villages in Luxembourg

Waldbillig
Villages in Luxembourg